Year 1436 (MCDXXXVI) was a leap year starting on Sunday (link will display the full calendar) of the Julian calendar.

Events 
 January–December 
 January 11 – Eric of Pomerania is deposed from the Swedish throne for the second time, only three months after having been reinstated. Engelbrekt Engelbrektsson remains the leader of the land, in his capacity of rikshövitsman (military commander of the realm).
 February – Charles Knutsson becomes joint rikshövitsman with Engelbrekt (the two will share the title until Engelbrekt's death).
 April – Paris is recaptured from the English by French forces during the Hundred Years War.
 May 4 – Following the murderer of Engelbrekt Engelbrektsson, while on his way to Stockholm for negotiations. Charles Knutsson temporarily holds the position of leader of Sweden alone. The probable first meeting of the Riksdag of the Estates takes place afterwards, in Uppsala, Sweden.
 June 25
 Scottish princess Margaret Stewart marries the future Louis XI of France in Tours.
 The Incorporated Guild of Smiths in Newcastle upon Tyne (England) is founded.
 July 5 – The Hussite Wars effectively end in Bohemia. Sigismund is accepted as King.
 July 29 – French forces abandon their Siege of Calais.
 August 30 – Brunelleschi's Dome at Florence Cathedral is dedicated.
 September 1 – Eric of Pomerania is once again reinstated as king of Sweden. Charles Knutsson, at the same time, resigns the post of rikshövitsman.
 September 10 – Battle of Piperdean: The Scottish defeat the English.

 Date unknown 
 Vlad II Dracul seizes the recently vacated throne of Wallachia, with Hungarian support.
 The Bosnian language is first mentioned in a document.
 Date of the Visokom papers, the last direct sources on the old town of Visoki.
 In Ming dynasty China, the inauguration of the Zhengtong Emperor takes place.
 In Ming dynasty China, a significant portion of the southern grain tax is commuted to payments in silver, known as the Gold Floral Silver. This comes about due to officials' and military generals' increasing demands to be paid in silver instead of grain, as commercial transactions draw more silver into nationwide circulation. Some counties have trouble transporting all the required grain to meet their tax quotas, so it makes sense to pay the government in silver, a medium of exchange that is already abundant amongst landowners, through their own private commercial affairs.
 The Florentine polymath Leon Battista Alberti begins writing the treatise On Painting, in which he argues for the importance of mathematical perspective, in the creation of three-dimensional vision on a two-dimensional plane. This follows the ideas of Masaccio, and his concepts of linear perspective and vanishing point in artwork.
 Afonso Gonçalves Baldaia becomes the first European to explore the western coast of Africa, past the Tropic of Cancer.
 Johannes Gutenberg begins work on the printing press.

Births 
 January 20 – Ashikaga Yoshimasa, Japanese shōgun (d. 1490)
 January 26 – Henry Beaufort, 3rd Duke of Somerset, Lancastrian military commander during the English Wars of the Roses (d. 1464)
 February 26 – Imagawa Yoshitada, 9th head of the Imagawa clan in Japan (d. 1476)
 April 4 – Amalia of Saxony, Duchess of Bavaria-Landshut (d. 1501)
 June 6 – Regiomontanus, German astronomer (d. 1476)
 November 5 – Richard Grey, 3rd Earl of Tankerville, English nobleman, attainted as a Yorkist supporter during the Wars of the Roses (d. 1466)
 November 16 – Leonardo Loredan, Doge of Venice (d. 1521)
 November 26 – Princess Catherine of Portugal, nun and writer (d. 1463)
 date unknown
 Sheikh Hamdullah, Anatolian Islamic calligrapher (d. 1520)
 Francisco Jiménez de Cisneros, Spanish cardinal and statesman (d. 1517)
 Hernando del Pulgar, Spanish writer (d. c. 1492)
 Abi Ahmet Celebi, chief physician of the Ottoman Empire (writer of a study on kidney and bladder stones; supporter of the research of Jewish doctor Musa Colinus ul-Israil on the application of drugs; founder of the first Ottoman medical school)

Deaths 
 Winter – Alexander I Aldea, Prince of Wallachia (probably of illness) (b.1397)
 May 4 – Engelbrekt Engelbrektsson, Swedish statesman and rebel leader (murdered) (b. c. 1390)
 October 8 – Jacqueline, Countess of Hainaut, Dutch sovereign (b. 1401)
 December 30 – Louis III, Elector Palatine (b. 1378)
 date unknown – Qāḍī Zāda al-Rūmī, Persian mathematician (b. 1364)

References